Admiral Douglas may refer to:

Archibald Douglas, 5th Earl of Angus (c. 1449–1513), Lord High Admiral of Scotland
Archibald Lucius Douglas (1842–1913), British Royal Navy admiral
Sir Charles Douglas, 1st Baronet (1727–1789), British Royal Navy rear admiral
Sir James Douglas, 1st Baronet (1703–1787), British Royal Navy admiral
James Douglas, 4th Earl of Morton (c. 1516–1581), Lord High Admiral of Scotland
John Erskine Douglas (c. 1758–1847), British Royal Navy admiral
Percy Douglas (1876–1939), British Royal Navy vice admiral
Peter John Douglas (1787–1858), British Royal Navy rear admiral
Robert Douglas (Royal Navy officer) (1829–1910), British Royal Navy admiral

See also
Cyril Douglas-Pennant (1894–1961), British Royal Navy admiral